Phalaenophana is a genus of litter moths of the family Erebidae. The species was first described by Augustus Radcliffe Grote in 1873.

Species
Phalaenophana eudorealis (Guenée, 1854)
Phalaenophana extremalis (Barnes & McDunnough, 1912)
Phalaenophana fadusalis (Walker, 1859) Brazil
Phalaenophana isenenias (Schaus, 1916)
Phalaenophana lojanalis (Dognin, 1914)
Phalaenophana modestalis (Schaus, 1912)
Phalaenophana nigridiscatalis (Dognin, 1914)
Phalaenophana oppialis (Walker, 1859)
Phalaenophana pyramusalis (Walker, [1859]) – dark-banded owlet moth
Phalaenophana santiagonis (Schaus, 1916)

References

Herminiinae
Moth genera